Klara and the Sun is the eighth novel by the Nobel Prize-winning British writer Kazuo Ishiguro, published on 2 March 2021. It is a dystopian science fiction story.

Set in the U.S. in an unspecified future, the book is told from the point of view of Klara, a solar-powered AF (Artificial Friend), who is chosen by Josie, a sickly child, to be her companion. 

The novel was longlisted for the 2021 Booker Prize.

Plot 
The novel is set in a dystopian future in which some children are genetically engineered ("lifted") for enhanced academic ability. As schooling is provided entirely at home by on-screen tutors, opportunities for socialization are limited and parents who can afford it often buy their children androids as companions. The book is narrated by one such Artificial Friend (AF) called Klara. Although Klara is exceptionally intelligent and observant, her knowledge of the world is limited.

From the window of the store in which she is for sale, Klara learns about the world outside and watches the Sun, which she always refers to as "he" and treats as a living entity. As a solar-powered AF, the Sun's nourishment is of great importance to her. On one occasion she notices that a beggar and his dog are not in their usual position; they are lying like discarded bags and do not move all day. It seems obvious to Klara that they have died, and she is surprised the next morning to see that they are living and that the Sun has with his great kindness saved them with a special kind of nourishment.

Klara comes to fear and hate what she calls the "Cootings Machine" (from the name printed on its side) which stands for several days in the street outside, spewing out pollution that entirely blocks the Sun's rays.

Klara is chosen by 14-year-old Josie, who lives with her mother in a remote region of prairie. Soon after joining them, Klara learns that the lifting process carries some risk: Josie's older sister Sal had earlier died, and Josie herself is gravely ill.

Josie's only near neighbour and childhood friend is Rick, a boy of about her own age. Although academically able, Rick has not been lifted and faces discrimination and reduced career prospects. In spite of this, Josie and Rick have always known that they will be together forever.

From Josie's bedroom Klara has a good view of the Sun's progress across the sky, and comes to believe that he goes to his nightly rest within a farmer's barn that stands on the horizon. With Rick's help, she makes her way there one evening across the grasslands. Although surprised to find the Sun's resting place is not actually in the barn, she pleads with him to pour his special kind of nourishment onto Josie and to save her life, as he did the beggar. She offers in return to find and destroy the pollution-creating Cootings Machine.

Josie's mother unexpectedly asks Klara to imitate Josie, which due to her exceptional powers of observation she can do almost perfectly. The mother regularly takes Josie to sit for her portrait, although unknown to her daughter the artist is making not a painting but a highly-accurate AF body. She intends that Klara will integrate her intelligence into it if Josie dies, becoming not simply a facsimile but Josie's true continuation.

When Klara next accompanies Josie into town, she finds and destroys a Cootings Machine, sacrificing in the process some of the P-E-G Nine solution she carries in her head and accepting that the loss may result in a reduction in her abilities. But Josie's condition worsens and the Sun does not respond. Klara returns to the barn to make another plea, reminding the Sun of Josie and Rick's genuine and everlasting love. Several days later as Josie seems near death Klara suddenly sees the dark clouds part, and the Sun sends his special nourishment flooding into her sick room. Josie seems better immediately, and over the following months recovers her health.

As Josie grows older she starts to drift away from Rick. Klara worries that she has misled the Sun and Rick comforts her, explaining that although his and Josie's paths in life may differ, their love really was genuine and they will always, at some level, be together. Josie leaves for college, and says goodbye to Klara.

The novel closes with Klara settled in a yard for scrapped AFs. She is no longer able to move around, but says she is content with her spot in the yard and declines to socialise with other AFs. The manager of her old store visits, and Klara tells her of happy memories and of the Sun's great kindness towards Josie.

Characters 

 Klara - An Artificial Friend (AF) who serves as the protagonist and narrator of the novel. She is chosen as Josie's companion after demonstrating outstanding observational and imitation skills. She is perceptive, curious and diligent, showing a willingness to sacrifice herself to help Josie. She goes to great lengths, including almost getting lost as she tries to reach the barn in which she believes the sun is living, and having Josie's father remove fluid from her head to destroy the Cootings machine, which damages her ability to function and perceive her surroundings. She is willing to rescind her own identity in order to 'continue' Josie's life in the event of her death.
 Josie - A gregarious teenaged girl who is suffering from illness after her 'lifting' (a process of genetic modification to increase intelligence in children). Despite her health issues, Josie is energetic and enthusiastic, although she possesses a tendency to act differently and even unkindly towards Klara and Rick in the presence of other lifted teenagers. By the end of the novel, her health has been miraculously restored and she is preparing to begin her university education.
 Rick - Josie's neighbour and childhood friend. Despite possessing good academic ability, Rick faces diminished educational and career opportunities as he has not been lifted. He has a close relationship with his single mother, who is suspected of hindering him so she would not have to be alone. Rick cares deeply about Josie, despite the pair's tendency to argue with one another. He visits her frequently when her illness worsens, playing games from their childhood. Although Rick is initially suspicious of Klara, as Josie promised that she would never use an AF, he warms to her as he learns of Klara's devotion to helping Josie.
 Mother - Josie's mother, who acts as Josie's carer. She is devoted to Josie's care, but can be subject to bouts of anger and depression, which causes her to be dismissive towards Klara. She is separated from Josie's father and is seen struggling with the loss of Josie's sister, Sal, prior to the events of the novel.
 Melania - Usually referred to as "Melania Housekeeper" by Klara. A housekeeper employed by Josie's family, who maintains the household and cares for Josie. She is initially unfriendly towards Klara, as she dislikes AFs, but eventually learns to trust her and asks her to protect Josie. 
 Manager - The unnamed manager who oversees the Artificial Friend shop from which Klara is purchased. Manager takes care of the AFs, mentoring them as companions and marketing them to customers. She is warm and encouraging towards Klara, repeatedly praising her for her observational abilities. Towards the end of the novel, Klara encounters Manager once more, and she confides that she sometimes browses scrap yards with the aim of meeting AFs that she once mentored. She tells Klara that she was excellent in her duties and offers to move her to a different spot before departing.

Publication 
Klara and the Sun was published on 2 March 2021 by Faber and Faber (UK) and Alfred A. Knopf (US).

The novel debuted at number six on The New York Times fiction best-seller list for the week ending 6 March 2021.

Reception 
Klara and the Sun received favourable reviews, with a cumulative "Positive" rating at the review aggregator website Book Marks.

In its starred review, Kirkus Reviews compared the novel to Ishiguro's Never Let Me Go and called it a "haunting fable of a lonely, moribund world that is entirely too plausible."

Publishers Weekly praised the "rich inner reflections" of Ishiguro's protagonist, writing, "Klara's quiet but astute observations of human nature land with profound gravity." Publishers Weekly proclaims, "This dazzling genre-bending work is a delight."

In her review for The New York Times, Radhika Jones notes that Klara and the Sun returns to the theme of The Remains of the Day as "Ishiguro gives voice to: not the human, but the clone; not the lord, but the servant. Klara and the Sun complements his brilliant vision, though it doesn't reach the artistic heights of his past achievements. . .when Klara says, "I have my memories to go through and place in the right order," it strikes the quintessential Ishiguro chord."

In a positive review, Cherwell described Ishiguro's novel as characterised by "elegance and poise", praising the narrator Klara as "a memorable first-person narrative voice, simultaneously robotic and infantile, scrupulous yet naïve." The novel's central image of the "paganistic worship of the Sun, nearly to the level of deification, by a purely mechanical vessel" is particularly celebrated. Yet, the book's inclusion of gene editing is criticised as "overly vague".

The Economist praised the book and mentioned that it affects "a cross between Never Let Me Go and The Remains of the Day, with Klara in the place of Stevens, the butler whose first-person narration provided a between-the-lines portrait of morality among the English upper crust in the interwar years."

Anne Enright, writing in The Guardian, found parallels with a different work by the author: "The themes of replication and authenticity are similar to those in Kazuo Ishiguro's Never Let Me Go, published in 2005. Both novels are set in a speculative future that feels quite like the present. Both also contain a secret moral shift: an advance in technology that has changed people's sense of what it is to be human, and the emotional punch of Klara, as with Never Let Me Go, comes from the fact that the central character doesn't know what is going on." Enright added, "The novel requires the reader to ask and settle, over and again, while the philosophical content quietly takes hold. Klara and the Sun is a book about what it is to be human. The fact that Ishiguro can make such huge concerns seem so essential and so simple is just one of the reasons he was awarded the Nobel prize. [...] People will absolutely love this book, in part because it enacts the way we learn how to love. Klara and the Sun is wise like a child who decides, just for a little while, to love their doll. 'What can children know about genuine love?' Klara asks. The answer, of course, is everything."

The novel was longlisted for the 2021 Booker Prize and the 2022 Andrew Carnegie Medal for Excellence in Fiction. It was selected for The Washington Posts "10 Best Books of 2021" list. The novel was also featured in "The 33 best books of 2021" list in The Times.

Adaptations 
The novel was read on BBC Radio 4 by actress Lydia Wilson, abridged by Richard Hamilton. It was broadcast in ten parts between 7 March and 19 March 2021.

Screen 
In July 2020, Sony's 3000 Pictures acquired the screen rights for Klara and the Sun. Dahvi Waller is set to adapt the novel, with Ishiguro to serve as executive producer.

References

External Links 
 The Guardian Review
 New York Times Review

2021 British novels
2021 science fiction novels
British science fiction novels
Dystopian novels
Faber and Faber books
Novels by Kazuo Ishiguro
Novels about androids
Novels set in the future
First-person narrative novels
Alfred A. Knopf books
Environmental fiction books